Nami Sano (born 17 April 1987, in Hyōgo Prefecture) is a Japanese manga artist. She was born in Hyōgo Prefecture.

She debuted as a cartoonist in 2010 with Fellow!. Her most famous manga is Haven't You Heard? I'm Sakamoto which was serialized in the magazine Harta from April 12, 2012, to December 14, 2015. It follows a high school student named Sakamoto who has a reputation for being the "coolest" person in the entire student body. The series was adapted into an anime series in 2016. Her second manga, Migi to Dali, was serialized from 2017 to 2021 also in the Harta magazine. It will also be adapted into an anime.

References

Manga artists from Hyōgo Prefecture
1989 births
Living people
Women manga artists